Mount Regan is a mountain on Vancouver Island, British Columbia, Canada, located  west of Courtenay and  north of Mount Albert Edward. It is associated with the Vancouver Island Ranges, the southernmost extant of the Insular Mountains.

Climate

Based on the Köppen climate classification, Mt. Regan is located in the marine west coast climate zone of western North America. Most weather fronts originate in the Pacific Ocean, and travel east toward Vancouver Island where they are forced upward by the ranges (Orographic lift), causing them to drop their moisture in the form of rain or snowfall. As a result, the mountains experience high precipitation, especially during the winter months in the form of snowfall. Temperatures can drop below −20 °C with wind chill factors below −30 °C. The months July through September offer the most favorable weather for climbing Regan.

See also

 List of mountains of Canada
 Geography of British Columbia
 Geology of British Columbia

References

External links
 Weather: Mount Regan

Vancouver Island Ranges
One-thousanders of British Columbia
Comox Land District